Hallion is a surname. Notable people with the surname include:

Richard P. Hallion, American writer
Tom Hallion (born 1956), American baseball umpire